Sejzi Industrial Zone (also Romanized as Monţeqeh Şanʿatī-ye Sejzī) is a village in Sistan Rural District, Kuhpayeh District, Isfahan County, Isfahan Province, Iran. At the 2006 census, its population was 19, in 8 families.

References 

Populated places in Isfahan County